Parapercis stricticeps, the white-streaked grubfish, is a fish species in the sandperch family, Pinguipedidae. It is found in eastern Australia. This species can reach a length of  TL.

References

Kuiter, R.H., 1993. Coastal fishes of south-eastern Australia. University of Hawaii Press. Honolulu, Hawaii. 437 p.

Pinguipedidae
Taxa named by Charles Walter De Vis
Fish described in 1884